August Traksmaa (27 August 1893 – 16 July 1942) was an Estonian officer and diplomat.

August Traksmaa was born as August Traksmann in the manorial estate in Põlula village, Kreis Wierland (now in Vinni Parish), in the Governorate of Estonia. He Estonianized his name to Traksmaa in 1935. He participated as an officer with the rank of captain in the Estonian War of Independence. From 1926, he was at the Estonian general staff and late became a divisional commander. Between 1936 and 1937 he served as ambassador to the Soviet Union. He was promoted to the rank of major-general in 1939 and for a brief period served as deputy minister of defence. During the Soviet occupation of Estonia, he was arrested and executed by Soviet forces.

References

1893 births
1942 deaths
People from Vinni Parish
People from Kreis Wierland
Estonian major generals
Imperial Russian Army officers
Russian military personnel of World War I
Estonian military personnel of the Estonian War of Independence
Recipients of the Order of Saint Stanislaus (Russian), 2nd class
Recipients of the Order of Saint Stanislaus (Russian), 3rd class
Recipients of the Order of St. Anna, 3rd class
Recipients of the Order of St. Anna, 4th class
Recipients of the Cross of Liberty (Estonia)
Recipients of the Military Order of the Cross of the Eagle, Class II
Estonian people executed by the Soviet Union
People who died in the Gulag